David Rock may refer to:

 David Rock (architect) (born 1929), English architect and graphic designer
 David Rock (historian), historian of Latin America
 David Rock (cricketer) (born 1957), English former cricketer
 David Rock, owner of the company TV Links
 Dave Rock, musician of Rilo Kiley